The Naismith Memorial Basketball Hall of Fame, located in Springfield, Massachusetts, honors players who have shown exceptional skill at basketball, all-time great coaches, referees, and other major contributors to the sport. It is named after James Naismith, who conceived the sport in 1891; he was inducted into the Hall as a contributor in 1959. To be considered for induction, nominees must meet certain prerequisites. Players must have been retired for at least three years before becoming eligible. Referees must have either been retired for at least three years, or, if they are still active, have officiated for at least 25 years at high-school-level programs or higher. Coaches must have either been retired for at least three years, or, if they are still active, have coached for at least 25 years at high-school-level programs or higher and from 2020 on must have coached for at least 25 years and reached the age of sixty years. Those being considered for induction as contributors may be inducted at any time; the Hall of Fame and its committees evaluate whether contributions are significant enough for the nominee to be inducted as a contributor. Teams are also inducted at the committees' discretion.

Members

Coaches

As part of the inaugural class of 1959, three coaches were inducted (Forrest C. "Phog" Allen, Henry Clifford Carlson and Walter E. Meanwell); in total, 100 coaches have been inducted into the Hall of Fame. Ten of the inducted coaches were born outside the United States: Cesare Rubini (Italy, 1994), Alexander Gomelsky (Soviet Union, now Russia, 1995), Antonio Díaz-Miguel (Spain, 1997), Aleksandar "Aca" Nikolić (Yugoslavia, now Serbia, 1998), Geno Auriemma (Italy, 2006), Alessandro "Sandro" Gamba (Italy, 2006), Mirko Novosel (Yugoslavia, now Croatia, 2007), Pedro Ferrándiz (Spain, 2007), Lidia Alexeeva (Soviet Union, now Russia, 2012), and Lindsay Gaze (Australia, 2015). Six of them have won championships in the EuroLeague or its historic predecessor, the FIBA European Champions Cup. Ten of the inducted coaches are women: L. Margaret Wade (1985), Jody Conradt (1998), Pat Head Summitt (2000), Sandra Kay Yow (2002), Sue Gunter (2005), Cathy Rush (2008), C. Vivian Stringer (2009), Tara VanDerveer (2011), Alexeeva (2012), and Sylvia Hatchell (2013). Five coaches have also been inducted as players: John Wooden, Bill Sharman, Lenny Wilkens, Tom Heinsohn, and Bill Russell. The most recent coaches to be inducted are Tom Izzo and John McLendon; the latter, inducted as a contributor in 1979, is the first individual to be inducted separately as a coach and contributor.

Most of the inductees have been college head coaches. Thirty-two have led a team to the National Collegiate Athletic Association (NCAA) men's championship and six have led a team to the NCAA women's championship. Twenty inductees have coached in the National Basketball Association (NBA). Twelve of them have won at least one NBA championship as head coaches; one other, Don Nelson, has five NBA championships as a player. Additionally, Bobby "Slick" Leonard won three titles in the former American Basketball Association. Larry Brown is the only inductee to coach both a college basketball team and a professional basketball team to a title, having coached the Kansas Jayhawks (NCAA) and the Detroit Pistons (NBA) to championships.

Six coaching inductees have received the Hall's John Bunn Award, given annually for significant contributions to the sport—Red Auerbach, Henry Iba, Ray Meyer, Summitt, Wooden, and Morgan Wootten.

Twelve inductees have, either before or after their induction, won an Olympic medal coaching a men's national team to a top-three finish in the Olympic tournament. Eight coached the U.S. national team, while the other four coached foreign national teams. Six inductees—Summitt, Yow, Auriemma, Van Chancellor, VanDerveer, and Alexeeva—have led a women's national team to a top-three finish in the Olympics. Alexeeva led the Soviet Union to two golds, while all the others led the United States to gold medals (Auriemma after his induction, the others before being inducted).

Six individuals inducted as coaches were associated with teams that have been inducted to the Hall as units. Donald L. "Don" Haskins, inducted in 1997, was the head coach of the 1966 Texas Western basketball team, which was inducted into the Hall in 2007. Chuck Daly, inducted in 1994, was the head coach of the "Dream Team", the USA team at the 1992 Olympics that featured 11 Hall of Fame players and was inducted as a unit in 2010. Wilkens, inducted as a coach in 1998, and Mike Krzyzewski, inducted in 2001, were Daly's assistants in 1992. Dutch Lonborg, inducted in 1973, was team manager for the 1960 U.S. men's Olympic team that was also inducted as a unit in 2010. Cathy Rush, inducted in 2008, was the head coach of the Immaculata College women's team of 1972–1974 that was inducted in 2014.

Contributors
For a person to be inducted to the Basketball Hall of Fame as a contributor, they must have made "significant contributions to the game of basketball". Of the inaugural Hall of Fame class of 1959, seven individuals were inducted as contributors, including James Naismith, the inventor of basketball. All former NBA commissioners (Maurice Podoloff, J. Walter Kennedy, Larry O'Brien, and David Stern) have been inducted. Fourteen individuals inducted as contributors have won the John Bunn Award, awarded by the Hall annually to a significant contributor: John Bunn (its inaugural recipient), J. Walter Kennedy, Cliff Fagan, Edward Gottlieb, Danny Biasone, Larry O'Brien, Dave Gavitt, C. M. Newton, Tex Winter, Meadowlark Lemon, Tom Jernstedt, Tom "Satch" Sanders, George Raveling, and Rod Thorn. Three inductees in this category are women: Senda Berenson Abbott and Bertha Teague (both inducted in 1985), and the most recent contributor to be inducted, Rebecca Lobo, who entered the Hall in 2017.

The exact number of individuals enshrined as contributors (as well as the number of player inductees) is subject to debate because of the Hall's treatment of 2014 inductee Nathaniel "Sweetwater" Clifton, one of the first African Americans to play in the NBA. While he was initially announced as a contributor, the Hall now classifies him as a player inductee.

Six inductees in this category were associated with teams that have been inducted to the Hall as units. Naismith organized The First Team, the group of players involved in the first-ever basketball game in 1891 and also inducted as part of the inaugural Class of 1959. Robert L. Douglas, inducted in 1972, was the founder and owner of the New York Renaissance, inducted in 1963. Pete Newell, inducted in 1979, was the head coach of the 1960 U.S. Olympic team inducted in 2010. Three were associated with the Harlem Globetrotters, inducted in 2002. Abe Saperstein, inducted in 1971, was the team's founder and owner. Kennedy, although best known for his time as NBA commissioner, had been the Globetrotters' public relations director in the 1950s. Lemon, inducted in 2003, was one of the team's most enduring on-court stars.

Ten individuals inducted in this category were born outside the United States—Naismith and Newell in Canada, Podoloff and Gottlieb in modern-day Ukraine (part of the Russian Empire when they were born in 1890 and 1898 respectively), Douglas in Saint Kitts and Nevis (part of the British West Indies at his birth in 1882), Saperstein in the United Kingdom, Biasone and Renato William Jones in Italy, Ferenc Hepp in modern-day Hungary (Austria-Hungary at his birth in 1909), and Borislav Stanković in what is now Bosnia and Herzegovina (the Kingdom of Yugoslavia at his birth in 1925).

In total, 65 or 66 individuals, depending on how Clifton is classified, have been inducted as contributors.

Players

As part of the inaugural class of 1959, four players were inducted, including George Mikan, who was the first NBA player to be enshrined. In total, 177 or 178 players, depending on Nathaniel Clifton's classification, have been inducted into the Hall of Fame. Of these, 110 or 111, again depending on Clifton's classification, have played in the NBA. The 1993 class had the most player inductees, with eight. No players were inducted in 1965, 1967, 1968 and 2007. Five players have also been inducted as coaches: John Wooden in 1973, Lenny Wilkens in 1998, Bill Sharman in 2004, Tom Heinsohn in 2015, and Bill Russell in 2021.

Twenty-seven player inductees are women: Lusia Harris-Stewart (1992), Nera D. White (1992), Ann E. Meyers (1993), Uļjana Semjonova (1993), Carol A. Blazejowski (1994), Anne T. Donovan (1994), Cheryl Miller (1995), Nancy I. Lieberman (1996), Joan Crawford (1997), Denise M. Curry (1997), Lynette Woodard (2004), Hortência de Fatima Marcari (2005), Cynthia Cooper-Dyke (2010), Teresa Edwards (2011), Katrina McClain Johnson (2012), Dawn Staley (2013), Lisa Leslie (2015), Sheryl Swoopes (2016), Rebecca Lobo (2017), Katie Smith (2018), Tina Thompson (2018), Teresa Weatherspoon (2019), Tamika Catchings (2020), Yolanda Griffith (2021), Lauren Jackson (2021), Pearl Moore (2021) and Theresa Grentz (2022). Among these, Lieberman, Woodard, Cooper-Dyke, Edwards, Staley, Leslie, Smith, Swoopes, Lobo, Thompson, Weatherspoon, Catchings, Griffith, and Jackson have played in the Women's National Basketball Association. Harris-Stewart is the only female drafted by an NBA team, while Meyers is the only one to have been signed by an NBA team.

Two player inductees have won the John Bunn Award—Bob Cousy and Wooden.

Twenty player inductees were born outside the United States. Canadian-born Robert J. "Bob" Houbregs (inducted 1987) was drafted by NBA's Milwaukee Hawks in 1953 and played five seasons in the league. Four inductees were born in the former Soviet Union: Sergei A. Belov, Šarūnas Marčiulionis, Arvydas Sabonis, and Uljana Semjonova. Belov, inducted in 1992, was born in modern-day Russia; Sabonis and Marčiulionis, respectively inducted in 2011 and 2014, were born in today's Lithuania. All three players won gold medals for the USSR at the Olympic Games. Marčiulionis and Sabonis each added two bronze medals for Lithuania after the restoration of its independence in 1990; Marčiulionis is also credited by the Hall with resurrecting the Lithuania national team after independence. Semjonova, inducted in 1993, was born in what is now Latvia. She won two Olympic golds with the USSR women's team.

Krešimir Ćosić, Dražen Petrović, Dražen Dalipagić, Dino Rađa, Vlade Divac, Toni Kukoč and Radivoj Korać (inducted in 1996, 2002, 2004, 2018, 2019, 2021 and 2022 respectively) represented Yugoslavia internationally during their careers. Petrović, Rađa and Kukoč represented Croatia after the initial breakup of Yugoslavia in 1991. Italian-born Dino Meneghin (inducted 2003) spent his entire career playing in the Italian A League.

Three Brazilians have represented their homeland internationally: Hortência de Fatima Marcari (inducted in 2005) for the women's national team, Maciel "Ubiratan" Pereira (inducted in 2010) and Oscar Schmidt (inducted in 2013) for the men's national team. Mutombo (inducted in 2015) was born in the country now known as the Democratic Republic of the Congo. Yao Ming, inducted in 2016, was born and raised in China.

American Dominique Wilkins, inducted in 2006, was born in France during his father's posting in that country as a member of the U.S. Air Force. John Isaacs (inducted in 2015) was born in Panama but raised in Harlem. Although born in New Jersey, 2017 inductee Nikos Galis played the whole of his professional career in Greece. 2018 inductee Steve Nash was born in Johannesburg, South Africa, and grew up in Canada.

Referees
The Referee category has existed since the beginning of the Hall of Fame and the first referee was inducted in 1959. Since then, 16 referees have been inducted, with Darell Garretson being the most recent entrant in 2016. Ernest C. Quigley, born in Canada, is the only inductee in this category born outside of the United States.

Teams
The Team category has existed since the beginning of the Hall of Fame and the first teams were inducted in 1959. Four teams were enshrined before 1963, but the fifth was not enshrined until 2002.  All told, 12 teams have been inducted, with the most recents being the Tennessee A&I State Teams of 1957, 1958, 1959 and the Wayland Baptist Women's Teams of 1948–82 inducted in 2019.

Notes
  According to individuals' pages on the official website

References
General
 
 
Specific

 
Nais